Alfred the Great is an 1831 historical play by the Irish writer James Sheridan Knowles. It portrays the life of the Anglo-Saxon King Alfred the Great.

It premiered at the Theatre Royal, Drury Lane in London. The title role was played by William Macready, a frequent collaborator of Knowles. Other members of the cast included Charles Mayne Young as Edric, John Cooper as Guthrum, James Vining as Oddune, Henry John Wallack as Oswith, Mary Warner as Elswith and Thomas Cooke as Kenric. The published version was dedicated to the reigning monarch William IV.

References

Bibliography
 Sebastian I. Sobecki. The Sea and Englishness in the Middle Ages: Maritime Narratives, Identity and Culture. Boydell & Brewer, 2011.

1831 plays
West End plays
Plays about English royalty
Cultural depictions of Alfred the Great
Plays by James Sheridan Knowles
Plays set in England
Plays set in the 9th century